My Dearest Friends (Italian: I miei più cari amici) is a 1998 Italian thriller-comedy film directed by Alessandro Benvenuti.

Cast
Alessandro Benvenuti as Alessio
Athina Cenci as Martha
Eva Robin's as Loretta
Alessandro Gassmann as Rossano
Gianmarco Tognazzi as Tommasi
Andrea Brambilla as Bric
Nino Formicola as Brac
Vito as Oscar
Marco Messeri as Ascanio
Umberto Smaila as Nemo
Flavio Bucci as the botanist
Cristina Moglia as Alda
Roberto Ciufoli as Luca
Alessandro Lombardi as the butler

References

External links

1998 films
1990s Italian-language films
1998 comedy films
Italian comedy films
Films directed by Alessandro Benvenuti
1990s Italian films